Bema is a comune (municipality) in the Province of Sondrio in the Italian region of Lombardy, located about  northeast of Milan and about  west of Sondrio.

Bema borders the following municipalities: Albaredo per San Marco, Averara, Cosio Valtellino, Gerola Alta, Morbegno, Pedesina, Rasura.

References

Cities and towns in Lombardy